Anusha Rahman Ahmad Khan  (born 1 June 1968) is a Pakistani politician who served as Federal Minister for Information Technology and Telecommunication, in Abbasi cabinet from April 2018 to May 2018. Previously she served as the Minister of State for Information Technology and Telecommunication of Pakistan from June 2013 to July 2017 in the third Sharif ministry and again from August 2017 to April 2018 in the Abbasi ministry. She had been a member of the National Assembly of Pakistan from 2008 to May 2018 representing the Pakistan Muslim League (N).

Early life and education
Anusha was born on 1 June 1968. and belongs to a pre-partition political family. In 1992, Rehman graduated with an LL.B. and received an LL.M. from University College London specializing in Law and Economics of regulated industries, networks and markets.

Professional career 
In early 1990s, Rehman started legal career. She is a professional corporate lawyer by profession. According to Rehman, she had been working with the telecom sector since the 1990s.

Political career 
Anusha began her political career in 2006 or 2007, when she was made senior vice president of the lawyers’ wing of PML-N. She played an active role in the lawyers movement for the restoration of the judiciary following Pakistani state of emergency, 2007. She was elected as a member of the National Assembly of Pakistan for the first time in 2008 Pakistani general election on a reserved seat for women. She was a member of the National Assembly Standing Committee on Law and Justice during her tenure in National Assembly. In 2009, Rehman was a key member of the PML-N's steering committee, which was tasked with dealing with legal matters.

She was re-elected as a member of the National Assembly of Pakistan for the second time in 2013 Pakistani general election on a reserved seat for women. In 2013, Rehman was appointed as the Minister of State for Information Technology and Telecommunication.

She had ceased to hold ministerial office in July 2017 when the federal cabinet was disbanded following the resignation of Prime Minister Nawaz Sharif after Panama Papers case decision. Following the election of Shahid Khaqan Abbasi as Prime Minister of Pakistan in August 2017, she was inducted into the federal cabinet of Abbasi. She was appointed as the Minister of State for Information Technology and Telecommunication.

In April 2018, she was elevated as the federal minister and was appointed as Federal Minister for Information Technology and Telecommunication in the cabinet of Prime Minister Shahid Khaqan Abbasi. Upon the dissolution of the National Assembly on the expiration of its term on 31 May 2018, Rehman ceased to hold the office as Federal Minister for Information Technology and Telecommunication.

Key Contributions & Achievements 
During her tenure. she had undertaken several policy and legislative initiatives to achieve the vision of knowledge based economy. She spearheaded formulation of Telecom Sector Policy 2015 to address emerging trends in the sector. She envisioned availability of universal, affordable and quality telecommunication services provided through open and competitive markets for the benefit of people. In 2017, Anusha Rahman received the "Government Leadership Award"  2017 for flagship policy project "Telecom policy 2015". She pioneered the e-Governance initiative in Pakistan with an objective of increasing overall public administration efficiency, enhancing transparency, improving citizens’ access to services and enhancing their participation in democratic governance processes. Her leadership and apt policy interventions have also led Pakistan to be among top five nations in terms of freelancing in IT products globally. The export of IT and ITES increased by over 380% during five years of her tenure.

In 2015, Rehman was awarded "GEM-TECH Global Achievers 2015" award by UN Women and the International Telecommunication Union in recognition of her work to empower women through technology.

Mobile Broadband, Pakistan was awarded “Spectrum for Mobile Broadband Award 2015 “at the prestigious Mobile World Congress 2015 in Barcelona under the leadership of Anusha Rahman. Pakistan was awarded for successfully auctioning spectrum for 3G/4G services in the 850 MHz, 1800 MHz and 2100 MHz bands in 2014, and thereafter the rapid uptake of 3G /4Gservices in the country where broadband which was less than 3% in 2013 went up to over 40 % today. She added that “The award of GSMA Spectrum for Mobile Broadband Award for 2015 to Pakistan is an indication of the global community reposing its trust in the Telecommunication Sector policy practices of the Government of Pakistan”

On Dec 2015, Anusha Rahman being the first women ICT Minister of Pakistan, introduced the program for girls referred as “ICTs for Girls”  for promoting inclusiveness and empowerment of girls/ young women to enable them contribute to and benefit from the value chain of ICTs. This program was designed to provide access to ICT infrastructure and tools, customized ICT education for specific skill development and the job market. As part of this program, tens of thousands of girls and women from disadvantaged segments of society have been provided digital infrastructure and digital skills with state of art machines in fully broadband supported environments. Microsoft has partnered to design, develop and train teachers on the “4 Cs” for skills education including: coding, computing, coaching and communication.

In July 2016, Pakistan’s first largest National Incubation Center was envisioned and launched under the leadership of Anusha through a public-private partnership of Ministry of Information Technology & Telecom, Ignite (Formerly National ICT R&D Fund) and Teamup. The NIC was structured to provide startups with a free of cost workspace, incubation, acceleration – Jazz xlr8 program – seed funds, and access to 50 million plus mobile 2016 customers. On July 20, 2016 at the launch, Anusha Rehman, Minister of State for IT & Telecom – Pakistan said, “The launch of the National Incubation Center is an important milestone in the Government of Pakistan’s digital agenda. I would like to appreciate the efforts of all our partners who have made this possible. I wish all the startups joining the National Innovation Center the very best in achieving their dreams, they are our future.” She led this ecosystem of entrepreneurship and expanded National Incubation Centers across Pakistan; Peshawar, Karachi, Lahore and Quetta.

In order to prepare the youth and the future workforce which is equipped with fourth industrial revolution, Anusha Rahman launched a "DigiSkills" Program  in Feb 2018 to Prepare One Million Freelancers in Pakistan. The programme was aimed at equipping the youth, freelancers, students, professionals, etc. with knowledge, skills, tools & techniques necessary to seize opportunities available internationally in online job market places and also locally. Prime Minister Shahid Khaqan Abbasi inaugurated the Digi Skills program aimed at training one million of the youth through online modules which successfully completed its scope.

Later on February 15, 2019, The Commonwealth Telecommunications Organisation (CTO) has appointed Anusha Rahman Khan, as the regional advisor to the secretary-general and the CTO for the East and South Asia region.

References

Living people
Pakistan Muslim League (N) politicians
Nawaz Sharif administration
20th-century Pakistani lawyers
Pakistani women lawyers
Pakistani MNAs 2008–2013
Pakistani MNAs 2013–2018
1968 births
Women members of the National Assembly of Pakistan
Federal ministers of Pakistan
Women federal ministers of Pakistan
21st-century Pakistani lawyers
21st-century Pakistani women politicians